Brent Ashley is a musician who was the former bassist for Combichrist and former bassist for the Natural Born Killers featuring Max Green of Escape The Fate. He is also a former member of Static-X and was also a part of Wayne Static's solo project band in support of his album Pighammer. Other past bands include The Dreaming, Orgy, Skold, Lacey Conner, September Mourning, Leisure, Davey Suicide, Psyclon Nine and Synical. Ashley and Green started a band called Violent New Breed. Their first album was out in 2016.

References
Wayne Static energizes Gallup audience, Navajo Times, Dec. 22, 2011
Static-X front man Wayne Static electrifies with Pighammer, Wrestling With Pop Culture, Dec. 14, 2011 
Wayne Static forges on with "Pighammer", Sound Spike, Jan. 4, 2012

Living people
Alternative metal bass guitarists
Combichrist members
Year of birth missing (living people)
Industrial metal musicians